Nossa alpherakii is a moth in the family Epicopeiidae first described by Alfred Otto Herz in 1904. It is found in North Korea.

References

Moths described in 1904
Epicopeiidae